Brig. Charity Bainababo is a Ugandan military officer, and legislator. She represents the Uganda people's defense forces (UPDF) in the parliament of Uganda.

Career 
Bainababo was once the ADC(Aide-de-camp) and head of security of Uganda's first lady and minister of Education Janet Kataha Museveni.

she is a Brigadier  of the Uganda People's Defense Forces (UPDF) and Deputy commander of the SFC.

Bainababo is an Army representative in the parliament of Uganda and doubles as the Dean of Uganda people's Defense Forces (UPDF) MPs in parliament.

References 

Women members of the Parliament of Uganda
Members of the Parliament of Uganda
21st-century Ugandan women politicians
21st-century Ugandan politicians
Year of birth missing (living people)
Living people